Jerzy Białłozor (c. 1622-1665) was a Polish nobleman, bishop of Smoleńsk since 1658 and Wilno since 21 November 1661, secretary of the King.

Son of Krzysztof Białłozor the Marshal of Upita and starost of Abele.

References 
 Ryszard Mienicki, Białłozor Jerzy. In: Polski Słownik Biograficzny, Vol. II, Kraków 1936, p. 8.

External links
 Biskup Jerzy Białłozor

Year of birth unknown
1665 deaths
Bishops of Vilnius
Bishops of Smolensk
Jerzy
Ecclesiastical senators of the Polish–Lithuanian Commonwealth
Year of birth uncertain
17th-century Roman Catholic bishops in the Polish–Lithuanian Commonwealth